Glenn Blakeney (born 22 February 1973) is a Bermudian cricketer. He is primarily an opening batsman, but sometimes also plays as a wicket-keeper. In his only first-class match against the USA in an ICC Intercontinental Cup game in 2004, he kept wicket throughout most of the match, although he did bowl for two overs whilst Irving Romaine kept wicket. He also represented Bermuda in the 2004 ICC Americas Championship.

References
Cricket Archive profile

1973 births
Living people
Bermudian cricketers
Bermuda One Day International cricketers
Wicket-keepers